Phenylsilver is an organosilver compound with the chemical formula C6H5Ag. It is a white solid. The structure is assumed to be polymeric.  Mesitylsilver is a tetramer.

Synthesis
It can be produced by treating silver nitrate with trialkylphenyltin (or trialkylphenyllead at −10 °C). In the presence of excess silver nitrate, the reaction produces the bright yellow complex C6H5Ag·2AgNO3. Phenylsilver can also produced by treating silver nitrate with diphenylzinc in a 1:2 molar ratio and 0 °C. If the molar ratio is 1:1, it will produce orange C6H5Ag·2AgNO3. Earlier syntheses using phenyl magnesium bromide will produce phenylsilver that contains silver or magnesium salt impurities, which destabilize it.

When heating phenylsilver in a speed of 5 °C/min, it decomposes at 67 °C. If the heating speed is 10 °C/min, it will explode at 47 °C.
 2 C6H5Ag → C6H5-C6H5 + 2 Ag

References

Further reading

External link

Substances discovered in the 1970s
Phenyl compounds
Organosilver compounds